Sorkh Alijeh (also Romanized as Sorkh ‘Alījeh and Sorkhelījeh) is a village in Parsinah Rural District, in the Central District of Sonqor County, Kermanshah Province, Iran. At the 2006 census, its population was 261, in 52 families.

References 

Populated places in Sonqor County